Sir Thomas Knyvet (died 1605), of Ashwellthorpe, Norfolk and Stradbroke, Suffolk, was an English politician.

He was the eldest son of Sir Thomas Knyvet of Ashwellthorpe, was educated at Queens' College, Cambridge (1584) and studied law at the Middle Temple (1591). He was knighted in 1603.

He was appointed Purveyor of the Tower Mint in 1600. He was elected a Member (MP) of the Parliament of England for Aldeburgh in 1593 and Thetford in 1601.

On his death he was buried at Feltwell, Norfolk. He had married Elizabeth, the daughter and coheiress of Nathaniel Bacon of Stiffkey, Norfolk, with whom he had 2 sons, one of whom was the Royalist JP Thomas Knyvett, and a daughter.

References

16th-century births
1605 deaths

Year of birth unknown
People from Ashwellthorpe and Fundenhall
People from Stradbroke
Thomas
High Sheriffs of Norfolk
English MPs 1593
English MPs 1601
Alumni of Queens' College, Cambridge